Minami-machi 6-chōme is a Hiroden station (tram stop) on Hiroden Ujina Line and Hiroden Hijiyama Line, located in Minami-machi, Minami-ku, Hiroshima.

Routes 
From Minami-machi 6-chōme Station, there are three of Hiroden Streetcar routes.

  Hiroshima Station - Hiroshima Port Route
  Hiroden-nishi-hiroshima - Hiroshima Port Route
 Hiroshima Station - (via Hijiyama-shita) - Hiroshima Port Route

Connections 
█ Ujina Line
 
Miyuki-bashi — Minami-machi 6-chōme — Hirodaifuzokugakkō-mae
█ Hijiyama Line

Minami-machi 2-chōme — Minami-machi 6-chōme — Hirodaifuzokugakkō-mae

Around station 
Nekoda Memorial Gymnasium

History 
Opened as "Minami-machi" tram stop, on December 27, 1935.
Renamed to "Minami-machi 3-chome" tram stop, after 1945.
Renamed to the present name "Minami-machi 6-chome", on May 1, 1971.

See also 

Hiroden Streetcar Lines and Routes
List of railway stations in Japan

External links

Hiroden Hijiyama Line stations
Hiroden Ujina Line stations
Railway stations in Japan opened in 1935